Darin Eric Allen (born January 5, 1965, in Columbus, Ohio, to parents David and Sharon Allen) is a former American amateur and professional boxer.

Darin Allen won the gold medal in the middleweight division at the 1986 World Amateur Boxing Championships, held in Reno, Nevada, by defeating East Germany's Henry Maske in the finals.

Amateur Boxing Career Notables
 1988 U.S. Olympic Trials Silver Medalist—Middleweight
 1986 World Amateur Boxing Championships Gold Medalist—Middleweight
 1985 U.S. Amateur Boxing Federation Champion—Middleweight
 1984 U.S. Olympic Trials Bronze Medalist—Light Middleweight

Professional Boxing Career
Allen began boxing in 1975, at the age of ten, and turned professional in 1988. He compiled a record of 23 wins (9 KO's) 3 losses and 1 draw before his retirement in 1997.

On July 19, 1997, Darin Allen fought William Guthrie for the then-vacant IBF World Light Heavyweight title. Guthrie defeated Allen by KO in the third round.  Shortly after the title match with Guthrie, the thirty-two-year-old Allen retired from boxing.

Insight
Darin Allen began his boxing career at the age of 10 and was coached by two-time U.S. AAU Boxing Coach of the Year William "Bill" Cummings Jr. In April 1985, Cummings died from an apparent heart attack. The untimely death of his coach along with the inspiration provided by Allen's close friend and teammate, 1984 Olympic Gold Medalist Jerry Page, culminated in motivating Allen to win his first national amateur title in December 1985.

References

External links
 The Dispatch, Lexington, NC

1965 births
Living people
Boxers from Columbus, Ohio
American male boxers
African-American boxers
AIBA World Boxing Championships medalists
Middleweight boxers
21st-century African-American people
20th-century African-American sportspeople